León Strembel ( born 23 june 1918 ) is an Argentine retired football midfielder.

Strembel began his career with Club Atlético Lanús in 1939. He played for the club through 1944, then he joined Racing Club de Avellaneda from 1945 to 1946. He also played for the Argentina national football team, appbearing in the South American Championship 1946.

In 1947 he joined Club Atlético Atlanta along with other prominent players such as José Soriano and Adolfo Pedernera as they attempted to build a super team. The project did not work out well with Atlanta suffering relegation at the end of the season. Strembel returned to Lanús for the following season where he played until his retirement in 1956.

References

External links
 León Strembel at BDFA.com.ar 

Possibly living people
Jewish footballers
Jewish Argentine sportspeople
Argentine Jews
Argentine footballers
Argentina international footballers
Club Atlético Lanús footballers
Racing Club de Avellaneda footballers
Club Atlético Atlanta footballers
Argentine Primera División players
Association football midfielders
1918 births